Olga is a 2004 Brazilian biographical drama film directed by Jayme Monjardim from a screenplay by Rita Buzzar, based on the 1985 biography of the same name by Fernando Morais. It was Brazil's submission to the 77th Academy Awards for the Academy Award for Best Foreign Language Film, but was not accepted as a nominee.

The film was a produced by Nexus Cinema in conjunction with Globo Filmes and Lumiere. Olga was seen by over three million viewers and won more than 20 awards in Brazil and internationally. It is one of several Brazilian films to treat Jewish themes.

Plot
Olga is the feature-film chronicle of the German Jew Olga Benário Prestes' (1908–1942) life and times. A communist activist since her youth, Olga is persecuted by the police and flees to Moscow, where she undergoes military training. She is put in charge of escorting Luís Carlos Prestes to Brazil to lead the Communist Uprising of 1935, falling in love with him along the way.

With the failure of the uprising, Olga is arrested alongside Prestes. Seven-month pregnant Olga is extradited by President Vargas' Government to Nazi Germany, where she gives birth to her daughter Anita Leocádia while incarcerated. Separated from her daughter, Olga is sent away to the Ravensbrück concentration camp, where she is executed in the gas chamber.

Cast

Awards
 Cinema Brazil Grand Prize 2005: Best Art Direction (Tiza Oliveira), Best Costume Design (Paulo Lóes) and Best Make-up (Marlene Moura).
 Havana Film Festival 2005: Audience Award.
 ABC Cinematography Award 2005: Best Art Direction (Tiza Oliveira) and Best Cinematography (Ricardo Della Rosa).
 Atlanta Jewish Film Festival 2007: Audience Award, Best narrative Film.
 Washington Film Festival 2005: Best Film.
 Viña Del Mar Film Festival 2005: Best Film, Best Direction (Jayme Monjardim) and Best Actress (Camila Morgado).

See also
 List of submissions to the 77th Academy Awards for Best Foreign Language Film

References

External links
 Official website
 
 

2004 films
2004 biographical drama films
2000s historical drama films
2000s Portuguese-language films
2000s war drama films
Biographical films about revolutionaries
Brazilian biographical drama films
Brazilian historical drama films
Brazilian war films
Cultural depictions of Adolf Hitler
Films about communism
Films based on biographies
Films set in the 1920s
Films set in the 1930s
Films set in the 1940s
Films set in Berlin
Films set in Rio de Janeiro (city)
Holocaust films
Vargas Era